Copelatus suppar is a species of diving beetle. It is part of the subfamily Copelatinae in the family Dytiscidae. It was described by Félix Guignot in 1956.

References

suppar
Beetles described in 1956